Rafael Moreno Valle Rosas (30 June 1968 – 24 December 2018) was a Mexican politician affiliated with the National Action Party (PAN). He was the governor of Puebla from February 2011 through January 2017.

Moreno Valle also served as a deputy of the LIX Legislature of the Mexican Congress representing Puebla and as a senator in the LX, LXI and LXIV Legislatures.

Moreno Valle was the grandson of Rafael Moreno Valle, a doctor and politician who also served as the governor of Puebla from 1969 to 1972. He was also the spouse of Martha Erika Alonso Hidalgo, the first woman governor of Puebla.

Death

On 24 December 2018, a helicopter carrying Moreno Valle, his wife Martha Erika Alonso Hidalgo, and other PAN politicians from the state crashed in a field near the town of Santa María Coronango, half an hour from the city of Puebla, killing both. In a tweet, President Andrés Manuel López Obrador indicated that Alonso and Moreno Valle were on the downed aircraft. At the time, Moreno Valle was a proportional representation senator.

A report by the Secretariat of Communications and Transportation (SCT) concluded on 27 March 2020, that the helicopter “should not have flown” because of a preexisting problem with a stability system on the helicopter that both the operator and the maintenance crew knew about.

References

1968 births
2018 deaths
People from Puebla (city)
Members of the Senate of the Republic (Mexico)
Members of the Chamber of Deputies (Mexico)
Governors of Puebla
National Action Party (Mexico) politicians
Victims of aviation accidents or incidents in Mexico
Victims of aviation accidents or incidents in 2018